Pope Justus was the 6th Pope and Patriarch of Alexandria.

Justus was an honorable and learned man before his ordination. He was baptized by Mark the Evangelist, along with his father, his mother and others. St. Mark also appointed him as the first Dean of the Catechetical School of Alexandria.  Anianus, the second patriarch, ordained him a deacon, then a priest, and appointed him to preach and teach the people. He was chosen as patriarch to succeed Primus. He shepherded his people with the best of care for ten years. He died on the 12th of Paoni 129 AD, in the sixteenth year of the reign of Hadrian.

References

129 deaths
Deans of the Catechetical School of Alexandria
2nd-century Popes and Patriarchs of Alexandria
2nd-century Christian saints
Year of birth unknown